The Lampang bent-toed gecko (Cyrtodactylus khelangensis) is a species of gecko that is endemic to Thailand.

References 

Cyrtodactylus
Reptiles described in 2014